is a museum dedicated to the area's fishing traditions in Toba, Mie Prefecture, Japan. Having first opened as the private Sea-Folk Museum in 1971, the museum reopened in its current location in 1992, and in 2017 was reestablished as a public, municipal museum under its current name. The collection, numbering some 61,840 items as of 31 March 2018, includes some ninety wooden boats from all over Japan, the nation's most comprehensive assemblage of materials relating to the Ama, and a grouping of 6,879 pieces of Ise Bay, Shima Peninsula, and Kumano Sea Fishing Equipment that have been jointly designated an Important Tangible Folk Cultural Property. The displays are organized around seven themes: traditions of sea-folk, sea-folk faith and festivals, sea pollution, Ama divers in Shima, fishing in Ise Bay, fishing in Shima and Kumano, and wooden boats and navigation.

See also

 Ise-Shima National Park
 Ise Jingū, Meoto Iwa
 Mikimoto Pearl Island
 Japan Heritage Story #073
 Mie Prefectural Museum

References

External links
 Toba Sea-Folk Museum

Toba, Mie
Museums in Mie Prefecture
Museums established in 1971
1971 establishments in Japan
Maritime museums in Japan
Fishing museums
Folk museums in Japan
Fishing in Japan